The Colo River, a perennial stream that is part of the Hawkesbury-Nepean catchment, is located in the Central Tablelands of New South Wales, Australia.

Course
The Colo River rises on the Great Dividing Range, northeast of Newnes, formed by the confluence of the Wolgan River and the Capertee River, which respectively drain the Wolgan and Capertee Valleys north of Lithgow. Colo River flows eastwards and then south through a deep gorge in the northern section of the Blue Mountains.  The majority of the river lies in Wollemi National Park. The middle Colo is inaccessible, rugged and remote. The wilderness was saved from development, logging and damming in the late 1970s by the Colo Wilderness Preservation Society and other environmentalists. Emerging from the wilderness region, the lower part of the Colo River flows through a scenic, narrow agricultural valley and reaches the Hawkesbury River at Lower Portland north of Windsor. Tributaries of the Colo include the Wollangambe River and Wollemi Creek. The river descends  over its  course.

At , the river is crossed by the Putty Road (B84).

Parts of the area surrounding the river, including both the Blue Mountains National Park and the Wollemi National Park have received World Heritage listing, due in part to the discovery of the Wollemi Pine, often described as a 'living fossil' from the age of the dinosaurs. The Colo River gorge contains many boulder-rapids that alternate with deep pools. Even though this area is relatively close to the Sydney metropolitan area, the Colo River flows through the largest wilderness area in New South Wales. Local volunteer bush regeneration groups such as the "Friends of the Colo" have been helping eradicate invasive exotic weeds in the area surrounding the river.

History
The traditional custodians of the land surrounding the Colo River are the Australian Aboriginal peoples of the Darug nation.

The area of the lower Colo River was first explored by Europeans in June 1789 by Governor Phillip and settlement commenced from the early 1800s via land grants, that were significantly expanded from 1833. The Colo River was an important transport corridor in the period before motor vehicles, with produce and goods transported down the Hawkesbury River to Sydney.

Recreation
Bushwalking, canoeing, fishing, and accommodation retreats are all popular recreation activities along various parts of the Colo River.

See also

 List of rivers of Australia
 List of rivers of New South Wales (A–K)
 Rivers of New South Wales

References

External links
 
 Friends of the Colo
 Colo River Subcatchment at the Hawkesbury-Nepean Catchment Management Authority website
 Colo River Subcatchment

Further reading

Hawkesbury River
Rivers of New South Wales
Central Tablelands
Rivers of the Blue Mountains (New South Wales)